The glossy black cockatoo (Calyptorhynchus lathami), is the smallest member of the subfamily Calyptorhynchinae found in eastern Australia. Adult glossy black cockatoos may reach  in length. They are sexually dimorphic. Males are blackish brown, except for their prominent red tail bands; the females are dark brownish with some yellow spotting. Three subspecies are recognised.

Taxonomy
The glossy black cockatoo was first described by Dutch naturalist Coenraad Jacob Temminck in 1807. The scientific name honours the English ornithologist John Latham.

The glossy black cockatoo's closest relative is the red-tailed black cockatoo; the two species form the genus Calyptorhynchus. They are distinguished from the other black cockatoos of the genus Zanda by different tail colour and head pattern, significant sexual dimorphism, and differences in two juvenile call types, a squeaking begging call and a vocalization when swallowing food.

Subspecies
The three subspecies were proposed by Schodde et al.  in 1993, although parrot expert Joseph Forshaw has reservations due to their extremely minimal differences.

C. l. lathami: (rare) The eastern subspecies found between southeastern Queensland and Mallacoota in Victoria, with isolated pockets in Eungella in central Queensland and the Riverina and Pilliga forest. It is associated with casuarina woodland.
C. l. erebus: Occurs in central Queensland from Eungulla near Mackay south to Gympie
C. l. halmaturinus: (endangered) The Kangaroo Island subspecies has been listed by the Australian Government as endangered. Restricted to the northern and western parts of the island, the population was as low as 158 individuals at one point but recovered to about 370 in 2019. It feeds on the drooping she-oak (Allocasuarina verticillata) and the sugar gum (Eucalyptus cladocalyx) In particular, the bird specialises in the most recent season's cones of  Allocasuarina verticillata over older cones of that species and Allocasuarina littoralis. It holds the cones in its foot and shreds them with its powerful bill before removing the seeds with its tongue. In early 2020, during the 2019-2020 Australian bushfire season, bushfire warnings were issued for the entirety of Kangaroo Island, giving rise to warnings from scientists that the continued viability of this subspecies in the wild might be doomed as its drooping she-oak food supply undergoes destruction by the fires. As of 6 January 2020, at least 170,000 hectares (one third of the island's area) had burnt. Occasional respites in the weather offer at least temporary relief from the bushfires; a full assessment of the status of the Kangaroo Island subspecies and its supporting ecosystem will take place after the ongoing bushfire crisis has passed. Reliable funding for the successful program to protect this subspecies – primarily from predation by the common brush tail possum – ended several years ago.

Description

Like the related red-tailed black cockatoo, this species is sexually dimorphic. The male glossy black cockatoo is predominantly black with a chocolate-brown head and striking caudal red patches. The female is a duller dark brown, with flecks of yellow in the tail and collar. The female's tail is barred whereas the male's tail is patched. The birds are found in open forest and woodlands, and usually feed on seeds of the she-oak (Casuarina spp.)

Conservation status

Like most species of parrots, the glossy black cockatoo is protected by the Convention on International Trade in Endangered Species of Wild Fauna and Flora (CITES) with its placement on the Appendix II list of vulnerable species, which makes the import, export, and trade of listed wild-caught animals illegal.

Glossy black cockatoos generally are not listed as threatened on the Environment Protection and Biodiversity Conservation Act 1999, however the Kangaroo Island subspecies (C. l. halmaturinis) was added to the list as endangered.

State of Victoria, Australia
 The eastern subspecies of the glossy black cockatoo (C. l. lathami) is listed as threatened on the Victorian Flora and Fauna Guarantee Act 1988.  Under this act, an "Action Statement" for the recovery and future management of this species has not been prepared.
 On the 2007 advisory list of threatened vertebrate fauna in Victoria, the subspecies C. l. lathami is listed as vulnerable.

State of Queensland, Australia
C. l. lathami is listed as vulnerable by the Queensland, Environmental Protection Agency.

References

Cited texts
 

 Flegg, Jim. Birds of Australia: Photographic Field Guide Sydney: Reed New Holland, 2002.
 Garnett, S. (1993) Threatened and Extinct Birds Of Australia. RAOU. National Library, Canberra. ISSN 0812-8014

External links
World Parrot Trust Parrot Encyclopedia - Species Profiles

glossy black cockatoo
Birds of Queensland
Birds of New South Wales
Birds of Victoria (Australia)
Endemic birds of Australia
glossy black cockatoo
Articles containing video clips